{{Infobox sportsperson
| name           = Raido Ränkel
| image          = 2023-02-12 BMW IBU World Championships Biathlon Oberhof 2023 – Men 12.5 km Pursuit by Sandro Halank–096.jpg
| image_size     =
| caption        = Raido Ränkel in Oberhof, Germany in February 2023
| birth_date     = 
| birth_place    = Rakvere, Estonia
| height         = 1.86 m (6' 1)
| weight         = 76 kg / 168 lbs
| headercolor    = 
| show-medals    = n
| medaltemplates =
}}
Raido Ränkel (born January 13, 1990, in Rakvere, EstoniaSochi 2014 profile) is a cross-country skier and a biathlete from Estonia.

He competed for Estonia at the 2014 Winter Olympics and 2018 Winter Olympics in the cross country skiing events, and biathlon at the 2022 Winter Olympics.

Biathlon results
All results are sourced from the International Biathlon Union.

Olympic Games

World Championships*During Olympic seasons competitions are only held for those events not included in the Olympic program.**The single mixed relay was added as an event in 2019.''

References

1990 births
Living people
Olympic cross-country skiers of Estonia
Cross-country skiers at the 2014 Winter Olympics
Cross-country skiers at the 2018 Winter Olympics
Biathletes at the 2022 Winter Olympics
Estonian male cross-country skiers
Tour de Ski skiers
Sportspeople from Rakvere
Estonian male biathletes
Olympic biathletes of Estonia
21st-century Estonian people